Sir John Wyndham Pope-Hennessy  (13 December 1913 – 31 October 1994), was a British art historian. Pope-Hennessy was Director of the Victoria and Albert Museum between 1967 and 1973, and Director of the British Museum between 1974 and 1976. He was a scholar of Italian Renaissance art. Many of his writings, including the tripartite Introduction to Italian Sculpture, and his magnum opus, Donatello: Sculptor, are regarded as classics in the field.

Early years
Born into an Irish Catholic family in the Belgravia district of Central London, Pope-Hennesssy's father was Major-General Richard Pope-Hennessy, who was the son of the politician John Pope Hennessy. Pope Hennessy's mother was Dame Una Pope-Hennessy. He was the elder of two sons; his younger brother, James Pope-Hennessy was a noted writer.

Pope-Hennessy was educated at Downside School, a Catholic boarding school for boys, in Stratton-on-the-Fosse. He then went on to Balliol College at the University of Oxford, where he specialised in modern history. At Oxford, he was introduced by Logan Pearsall Smith, a family friend, to Kenneth Clark, who later became a mentor.

Upon graduation, Pope-Hennessy embarked his journeyman years by travelling in continental Europe and becoming acquainted with art collections, both public and private.

Career

Between 1955 and 1963, Pope-Hennessy's three-volume Introduction to Italian Sculpture was published, covering Gothic, Renaissance and High Renaissance and Baroque sculpture. The following year, he was named Slade Professor of Fine Art at the University of Cambridge.

Pope-Hennessy served as the director of the Victoria and Albert Museum between 1967 and 1973, and then as director of the British Museum from 1974 until 1976. There, he was nicknamed by colleagues as "The Pope".

Traumatised by the murder of his gay brother James in January 1974, Pope-Hennessy left the British Museum after only two years as director. Initially, he went to Tuscany, but was enticed by an offer from the Metropolitan Museum of Art to head its department of European painting, and moved to New York City. He combined this curatorial post with a professorship at New York University's Institute of Fine Arts. Pope-Hennessy was elected to the American Philosophical Society in 1974 and the American Academy of Arts and Sciences in 1978. In 1986, Philippe de Montebello, director of the Metropolitan Museum of Art, created the John Pope-Hennessy Curatorship of European Paintings.

Pope-Hennessy also served on the boards of the Venice in Peril Fund and Save Venice Inc., two non-profit organisations dedicated to the conservation and preservation of Venetian cultural heritage.

Besides his own scholarly publications, some of which became classics and were often reprinted, and his responsibilities as a museum director, he provided his name and expertise for others (such as Sotheby's or the Collins Encyclopedia of Antiques). He also wrote a foreword for Helmut Gernsheim's photographies of Beautiful London, contributed to a book on Westminster Abbey (1972), and wrote his autobiography that was published in 1991.

Death and legacy

Pope-Hennessy retired at the age of seventy-five and moved permanently to Florence with his lover, Michael Mallon, and resided at  Palazzo Canigiani, where he died five years later. Pope-Hennessy is buried in the Cimitero degli Allori in Florence. His gravestone includes a quote from the First Epistle to the Corinthians in the Bible.

Bibliography
 Sassetta, Chatto & Windus 1939
 Sienese Quattrocento Painting, Phaidon 1947
 The Drawings of Domenichino in the Collection of His Majesty the King at Windsor Castle, Phaidon 1948
 A Lecture on Nicholas Hilliard, Home and Van Thal 1949
 Uccello. The Complete Work of the Great Florentine Painter, Phaidon 1950
 Fra Angelico. Complete Edition, Phaidon 1952
 Piero Della Francesca, The Metropolitan Museum of Art Miniatures, 1954
 Introduction to Italian Sculpture (3 vols.), Phaidon 1955–1963, 3rd revised ed. 1996
 Vol. I: Italian Gothic Sculpture, 1955
 Vol. II: Italian Renaissance Scutpture, 1958
 Vol. III: Italian High Renaissance and Baroque Sculpture, 1963
 The Life of Benvenuto Cellini. Written by Himself, introduced and illustrated by JPH, Phaidon 1960
 The Portrait in the Renaissance, the A. W. Mellon Lectures in the Fine Arts, Phaidon 1963
 Renaissance Bronzes from the Samuel H. Kress Collection, Phaidon 1965
 Essays on Italian Sculpture, Phaidon 1968
 The Frick Collection. An Illustrated Catalogue, assisted by Anthony F. Radcliffe, Princeton Univ. Press 1970
 Vol. III: Sculpture – Italian
 Vol. IV: Sculpture – German, Netherlandish French and British
 Raphael, The Wrightsman Lectures, delivered under the Auspices of the New York University Institute of Fine Arts, Harper & Row 1970
 The Study and Criticism of Italian Sculpture, Metropolitan Museum of Art/Princeton Univ. Press 1980
 Luca Della Robbia, Cornell Univ. Press 1980
 Cellini, photography by David Finn, Takashi Okamura a.o., Abbeville 1985
 Donatello, photography by Liberto Perugi, critical apparatus by Giovanna Ragionieri, Cantini (Florence) 1985 (Italian)
 Learning to Look. An Autobiography, Heinemann 1991
 The Piero Della Francesca Trail, Twenty-Third Walter Neurath Memorial Lecture, Thames & Hudson 1991
 Andrea Mantegna, photography by David Finn, Olivetti/Electa 1992
 Paradiso: The Illuminations to Dante's Divine Comedy by Giovanni di Paolo, Random House 1993
 Donatello: Sculptor, Abbeville 1993 

Victoria and Albert Museum publications

As the museum's director he wrote the foreword for several exhibition catalogues –Musical Instruments as Works of Art (1968), Berlioz and the Romantic Imagination, English Watches, Fine Illustrations in Western European Printed Books and The Fashionable Lady in the 19th Century (all in 1969), Charles Dickens (1970), Kokoschka: Prints and Drawings (1971), a.o.– and introduced the Museum's first Yearbook in 1969. But even before that he wrote the texts and was responsible for the following publications
 Victoria and Albert Museum Monographs
 No. 1: Donatello's Relief of the Ascension with Christ Giving the Keys to St. Peter, HMSO 1949
 No. 2: The Virgin with the Laughing Child, HMSO 1949
 No. 5: Italian Gothic Sculpture in the Victoria & Albert Museum, HMSO 1952
 No. 6: The Virgin and Child by Agostino di Duccio, HMSO 1952
 No.  : Samson and a Philistine by Giovanni Bologna, HMSO 1954
 The Raphael Cartoons (foreword), HMSO 1950
 Catalogue of Italian Sculpture in the Victoria and Albert Museum (3 vols.), HMSO 1964
 An Ivory by Giovanni Pisano, Museum Bulletin 1965
 An American Museum of Decorative Art and Design: Designs from the Cooper-Hewitt Collection, New York, HMSO 1973

Metropolitan Museum of Art catalogues
 Secular Painting in 15th-Century Tuscany: Birth Trays, Cassone Panels, and Portraits, co-ed. with Keith Christiansen, 1980
 France in the Golden Age: Seventeenth-Century French Paintings in American Collections, with Pierre Rosenberg, Grand Palais, Paris, 1982
 The Jack and Belle Linsky Collection in The Metropolitan Museum of Art, 1984
 Italian Paintings in the Robert Lehman Collection, 1986
 Giovanni di Paolo, Museum Bulletin Vol. XLVI, Nr. 2, 1988
The Metropolitan Museum also published John Pope-Hennessy: A Bibliography in 1986, compiled by Everett Fahy

Posthumous compilations
 On Artists and Art Historians: Selected Book Reviews by John Pope-Hennessy, Villa i Tatti: The Harvard Univ. Center for Italian Renaissance Studies, 12, edited by Walter Kaiser and Michael Mallon, L. S. Olschki (Florence) 1993
 Italian Art 1200-1800 from the Libraries of Sir John Pope-Hennessy & Rudolf Wittkower with Some Additions, Catalogue No. 188 (listed are 1214 monographs plus 938 general books), Ursus Books 1996

See also
 List of directors of the British Museum

References

External links
 Finding aid for the John Pope-Hennessy Papers at the Getty Research Institute.

1913 births
1994 deaths
British people of Irish descent
British Roman Catholics
People from Belgravia
People educated at Downside School
Alumni of Balliol College, Oxford
British art historians
British curators
Directors of the Victoria and Albert Museum
Directors of the British Museum
People associated with the Metropolitan Museum of Art
Slade Professors of Fine Art (University of Oxford)
Academics of the University of Cambridge
New York University Institute of Fine Arts faculty
Commanders of the Order of the British Empire
Fellows of the British Academy
Fellows of the Society of Antiquaries of London
British expatriate academics in the United States
British expatriates in Italy
20th-century English LGBT people
Members of the American Philosophical Society